Danièle Wild Bouteleux (born 20 November 1940) is a French former professional tennis player.

Bouteleux made her first main draw appearance at the French Championships in 1959 and was a regular participant at her home tournament, featuring for the last time in the 1980 French Open qualifiers. During this period she also competed at Wimbledon and made the singles third round twice. She married French tennis player Alain Bouteleux.

References

External links
 
 

1940 births
Living people
French female tennis players